This article contains information about the literary events and publications of 1686.

Events
January – John Dryden is recorded as having converted to Roman Catholicism.

New books

Prose
Pierre Bayle – Philosophical Commentary (on religious freedom)
Bernard de Fontenelle
Entretiens sur la pluralité des mondes (Conversations on the Plurality of Worlds)
L'Histoire des oracles
Gottfried Leibniz 
Brevis Demonstratio Erroris Memorabilis Cartesii et Aliorum Circa Legem Naturae (A Brief Demonstration of the Memorable Error of Descartes and Others About the Law of Nature)
Discours de Métaphysique
Ihara Saikaku (井原 西鶴)
Twenty Cases of Unfilial Children (本朝二十不孝 Honchō Nijū Fukō)
The Life of an Amorous Woman (好色一代女 Kōshoku Ichidai Onna)
Thomas Sydenham – Schedula monitoria de novae febris ingressu (Schedule of Symptoms of Newly Arrived Fever)

Children
John Bunyan – A Book for Boys and Girls, or, Country Rhymes for Children

Drama
Aphra Behn and John Blow – The Lucky Chance
Thomas d'Urfey – The Banditti
Thomas Jevon – The Devil of a Wife

Poetry
Anne Killigrew (posthumously) – Poems

Births
January 17 – Archibald Bower, Scottish historian (died 1766)
August 12 – John Balguy, English philosopher (died 1748)
September 5 – Antoine Touron, French historian and biographer (died 1775)
unknown date – Alban Thomas, Welsh physician and antiquarian (died 1771)

Deaths
January 31 – Jean Mairet, French dramatist (born 1604)
February 6 – Dorothy White, English Quaker pamphleteer (born c. 1630)
February 10 – William Dugdale, English antiquary and herald (born 1605)
February 25 – Abraham Calovius, German Lutheran theologian (born 1612)
June 23 – Sir William Coventry, English statesman and author (born c. 1628)
July 10 – John Fell, English academic and bishop (born 1625)
August 13 – Louis Maimbourg, French Jesuit historian (born 1610)
November 25 – Nicolas Steno (Niels Steenson), Danish scientist (born 1638)
November 28 – Nicolas Letourneux, French religious writer (born 1640)
December 6 – Nicola Avancini, Italian Jesuit writer (born 1612)

References

 
Years of the 17th century in literature